Herman Schroeder was a member of the Wisconsin State Assembly.

Biography
Schroeder was born in Milwaukee, Wisconsin in July 1868, sources have differed on the exact date. Later that year, he moved with his parents to Fond du Lac County, Wisconsin. There, he became a farmer. In 1893, Schroeder married Wilhelmina Neumann. They had four children. Schroeder was sentenced to prison in 1930 because of counterfeiting.

Political career
Schroeder was elected to the Assembly in 1916 and 1918. Other positions he held include treasurer of Empire, Wisconsin. He was a Republican.

References

Politicians from Milwaukee
People from Empire, Wisconsin
Republican Party members of the Wisconsin State Assembly
City and town treasurers in the United States
Farmers from Wisconsin
1868 births
Year of death missing